The Devizes to Westminster International Canoe Marathon is a marathon canoe race in England. It has been run since 1948. Starting at Devizes wharf, the route follows the Kennet and Avon canal for 54 miles to Reading, where it joins the Thames. Another 54 miles later it reaches Teddington Lock, ending 17 miles later at Westminster Bridge.

Personalities to own a DW medal are former leader of the Liberal Democrats, Paddy Ashdown, explorer Sir Ranulph Fiennes, TV Presenter Steve Backshall, Olympic gold medallist rowers James Cracknell and Helen Glover, adventurer Sarah Outen, and the first British woman to climb Everest Rebecca Stephens.

Route

From Reading the race follows the non-tidal River Thames down stream for  through Henley-on-Thames, Marlow, Maidenhead, Windsor, Staines and Kingston before reaching the tidal River Thames at Teddington Lock. The tidal river is followed for the final  through the western suburbs of London to Westminster. The 2008 race was the 60th anniversary of the event.

The course requires competitors to portage their canoes and kayaks around 77 locks. Starting from Devizes, there are four locks before the  Bruce tunnel, and another 31 locks before Newbury wharf, and the end of the first stage, is reached. Stage 2 contains 22 locks on the Kennet and Avon Canal, before the junction with the River Thames is reached, and a further six locks on the Thames, before the stage ends above Marlow lock. Stage 3 includes 14 locks, ending below Teddington lock, while stage 4 contains a single lock at Richmond before the final  on the tideway. Richmond lock is only operational at some states of the tide, and so a portage may be avoided if passage is made during a period of 2 hours either side of high tide.

History
The idea of canoeing from Devizes to Westminster was first suggested by Roy Cooke, who had been part of a team who had attempted to canoe along the River Avon from Pewsey, near Devizes, to the sea at Christchurch in 1947. He then planned to see if it was possible to reach Westminster from Devizes in under 100 hours. At the time, much of the Kennet and Avon Canal was derelict, but still in water. He was unable to attempt the course, but a number of locals offered some money for Scout funds if the Devizes Scouts could succeed in "taking a boat from Devizes to Westminster in under 100 hours, all food and camping kit to be carried in the boats". Four of the scouts, Peter Brown, Laurie Jones, Brian Smith and Brian Walters, all aged 17, attempted the route at Easter 1948. The event generated much interest, with some national press coverage, and a large crowd gathering at Westminster Bridge to see the end of the feat, which was completed in 89 hours 50 minutes.

Chippenham Sea Cadets attempted the route at Whitsun 1948, and managed to reduce the time to 75 hours 50 minutes, but several attempts later in the year were thwarted by the amount of weed in the canal. In 1949, although no race had been organised, nearly 20 boats attempted the course at Easter, and although many failed to complete it, two crews representing Richmond Canoe Club completed it in 49 hours 32 minutes, and a team from Bristol Scouts managed 53 hours 10 minutes.

In view of the interest shown, Frank Luzmore, one of the competitors from Richmond Canoe Club, decided to organise the event as an annual contest. Albert Weibel, another member of the Richmond Canoe Club, donated a trophy for the winner, and at Easter 1950, 17 boats took part in the first official race. A team from Richmond Canoe Club won again, by completing the course non-stop in 34 hours 52 minutes, closely followed by a team representing the Royal Marines. Ten of the boats completed the course.

The armed forces saw the race as an opportunity for training, and because they organised the backup support as a military exercise, won the race from 1951 until 1970, with the exception of 1952. Teams from the Paras, Royal Marines, SAS and Special Forces competed, with Dansie and Dry, representing the SAS, completing the course in just over 24 hours in 1951. Officially, every boat had to carry cooking equipment, camping equipment and a host of other standard items, and no assistance from a support team was allowed. Even water could only be obtained from official watering points.

As the main race soon became a one-day event, rather than a four-day one, much of the official kit was redundant, and there was widespread breaking of the rules. In 1966, one of the crews who finished the race was disqualified, two crews had time penalties added to the time they actually took, and 49 of the crews who failed to finish were deemed to have broken the rules, and so would have been disqualified if they had finished. The military teams, with their radio networks, were particularly good at offering support, in particular food, to their teams at remote locations, where they were unlikely to be seen by race officials.

Recognising that the military had an unfair advantage, the rules were changed in 1971, so that boats did not have to carry "all food and camping kit", and the use of support teams to supply food and drink was allowed. Peter Lawler and Chris Baker, both from Richmond Canoe Club, and who had canoed for Britain at international level, took up the challenge, and succeeded in beating Paganelli and Evans, who had won the race for the Paras in 1968, 1969 and 1970.

Junior and Ladies Classes
Junior teams were originally banned from the race on safety grounds, but the pressure to allow them to compete resulted in the introduction of stages in 1953, originally two, but soon changed to three, with compulsory overnight stops at Newbury, Marlow and Ham, just below Teddington lock. There were two crews in the junior category in 1953, but this had risen to over 50 by 1961, and in 1970 there were 100 junior crews. Numbers after that gradually declined, but a schools trophy was set up in 1975, and school teams now account for most of the junior entries. Women were barred from the race at first, and it was not until 1971 that Sheila Burnett from Cambridge Canoe Club finished the race with Colin Dickens, only to be disqualified when it was discovered that she was a woman. In 1973, Anne-Marie Evans entered the race under a false name, in partnership with Jonathan Hutt, and was awarded a certificate for finishing, but the official policy was still that women should not enter the race. By the late 1970s attitudes had changed, and the first all-female crew finished the race in 31 hours 6 minutes in 1976. Trophies for ladies and mixed doubles classes were introduced in 1980. In 1995, Danielle Sellwood and Sandra Troop set the women's record at 18 hours 47 minutes, and in 1997 Danielle Sellwood was placed third overall, becoming the first woman to hold the civilian trophy. A class for junior ladies was introduced in 1976, and a junior mixed doubles class in 1981.

The original rules published in 1950 states "The Cup may be competed for by any canoeing team without restriction of age, its members must be normally resident in the British Isles."  The first crews to complete the course and begin the event were in fact all Juniors.  The stage race, started in 1953 was introduced by the first more formal organisation to prevent Junior crews attempting to complete the course non-stop.  There was no rule preventing women from entering the race.  In 1953 Canoe Camper reported "Women are catered for in F 2s and Canadians".  After that date and for reasons that are not clear women were officially prevented from entering the race until 1976 although the first all-woman crew of Jo Saxby and Maurene Hossack entered unofficially in 1975 and were given an official completion certificate by the DW organisation. (www.canoeraceresults.co.uk History)

Other race developments
Concerned for the safety of paddlers attempting to run DW non-stop in singles (some successfully, including one by a Hungarian in a racing C1), the committee introduced a singles event in 1986 using the same stage format as the junior race. This event has proved especially popular with foreign competitors as knowledge of the course is not so vital.

A junior / veteran class was introduced in 1989, with the intention of giving parents an opportunity to paddle with their offspring. However, many parents have been wise enough not to risk it, and have let their children paddle with someone else!

A welcome initiative to the race in the 1980s, introduced by the chairman of the committee Peter Begent, was the formal encouragement of competitors to raise money for charities by being sponsored to complete the race. Now, every year many thousands of pounds are raised by paddlers for numerous charities, and the Pfeiffer Trophy is awarded to the crew raising the largest amount of money.

In 2002, the Endeavour Class was introduced to allow older paddlers who may have done DW earlier in their lives, and also inexperienced beginners to join DW as a 4-day tour of the course without suffering the stress of racing. This non-competitive class is also free from the restriction of overnight camping within 200 metres of the course, allowing the use of hotel and B&B accommodation.

The 1000 Mile Club was introduced in 2011, an honour recognising the achievements of those who had completed the race eight times.

Classes
There are five classes of event, each with its own set of rules.

Senior Doubles: This is a non-stop race, timed continuously from the moment they start, until either they reach Westminster, or they admit defeat (which accounts for one third of the entries, rising to half in 1998).
Junior Doubles: Two crew members, completing the course in four stages with overnight stops.
Junior/Veteran: Two crew members, one who must be a junior, and one who must be over 35, completing the course in four stages with overnight stops. This class was introduced in 1989 to encourage parents to canoe with their children, but most crews which have entered are not related.
Senior Singles: One person kayaks or canoes, over the same four stages.
Endeavour: A doubles class held over four stages which is non-competitive.

The stages in the Stages race are as follows:
Stage 1: Devizes Wharf to Northcroft Leisure Centre, Newbury  (34.4 miles)
Stage 2: Northcroft Leisure Centre, Newbury to Marlow (35.6 miles)
Stage 3: Marlow to Thames Young Mariners, Teddington (37.5 miles)
Stage 4: Thames Young Mariners, Teddington to Westminster Bridge (17.5 miles)

Cancellations and abandoned races
In 2000 heavy rainfall had brought the River Thames up to flood levels with fast flowing water. A number of crews found the conditions on the Thames challenging, especially during the darkness of night-time for the non-stop crews. After an incident at Old Windsor wier the race committee took the decision to abandon the race. As some teams had already reached Teddington (and were waiting to access the tidal stretch) when the decision was made, they decided (against the race organisers instructions) to remove their race numbers and carry on unofficially to Westminster.

In 2001, along with a large number of events in the UK, the race could not take place due to a nationwide outbreak of Foot-and-mouth disease restricting unnecessary access to the countryside (and thus large parts of the course).

In 2016 Storm Katie brought storm force winds to London on Easter Monday meant that a decision was made to cancel the last day of the staged race and the results were based on the times taken to reach Thames Young Mariners. Finishers medals were awarded to those that reached this point and certificates issued marked "shortened course". This decision didn't impact the non-stop race, which had already finished on Easter Sunday.

In 2018 heavy rainfall prior to the Easter weekend and throughout Good Friday once again brought the River Thames up to flood levels with fast flowing water. The race committee initially made a decision that no night-time paddling should occur on the Thames, but with conditions worsening then decided that all classes would finish at Reading (Wokingham Canoe Club at Dreadnaught Reach). No finishers medals were issued and certificates were marked with "shortened course".

In 2020 & 2021 the event was cancelled because of the COVID-19 pandemic.

In 2022 the event was shortened to 108 miles and finished at Teddington. This was due to the grounds of St Thomas' Hospital being unavailable due to the vaccination station there.

Course records
The current (non-stop) course record stands at 15 hours 34 minutes and was set in 1979 by Brian Greenham and Tim Cornish, one from Richmond Canoe Club and one from Reading Canoe Club.

For the staged events; the solo record was set in 1993 by G Butler of Nottingham Kayak Club in a time of 14 hours 46 minutes. The junior record was also set in 1993 by the Richmond / Royal pairing of Steve Jensen and Tony Richardson in the phenomenal time of 14 hours 13 minutes, faster than the senior record, but then they did have three nights sleep on the way down!

Baker/Capps 2000. Steve Baker recorded the closest time to the Greenham/Cornish record ( by 3mins in 1998).
Easter 2000 with a late Easter bringing mild conditions and heavy rainfall filling the River Thames up to flood levels Baker & Capps were optimistic a record was on.

The crew set off from Devizes at 0551hrs on Easter Saturday morning for a daylight run to catch the evening tide (slower crews started on Good Friday and paddle through the night to finish on Saturday mornings’ tide) with a schedule set for 15hrs 30mins.   Made good time on the first 14 ‘portage free’ miles and were on schedule when they arrived at Froxfield Lock 3hrs into the race.  At this point they were told by their support crew that the race organisers had decided to abandon the event following a safety incident at Old Windsor weir the previous night.  The support crew explained that while they could not keep racing officially, but they were happy to carry on if the crew were, the watches were still running and they felt that we could still get the challenge record.  Having prepared solely for this race for 4 months Capps/Baker made the decision to go for it, removing the number from the boat and informed the DW organisation we were no longer in any way their responsibility and got back on the water.
The crew went through Newbury in 4hrs 47mins and off the canal in 7hrs 29mins which had them back on schedule despite the halt.  By this stage the duo had picked up a multitude of supporters who were absolutely amazing and just kept encouraging and willing the crew on to beat that record.  Joining the River was great and with a good flow they picked up time all the way down completing the 54 miles in 6hrs (averaging 9 mph) arriving at Teddington at 1920hrs for the Tideway, well up on schedule. The crew were able to pick up the pace spurred on by familiar sights and the welcome relief of the lights on the London Eye wheel.  Baker/Capps raced under Westminster Bridge and could see from the illuminated face of Big Ben that they had managed to complete the 17mile Tideway section in just under 1hr 48mins.

The total time was 15hrs 17mins 45secs beating the official record by over 16 mins.

In 2011, world champion kayakers Ben Brown and Ivan Lawler attempted to beat the record, but retired after 9 hours and 51 minutes, defeated by wrist injury, exceptionally slow flow on the Thames and a mounting headwind.

Similar races

In the months leading up to the races, there are two series of races, the Thameside Series and Waterside Series, that are deemed good practice for crews competing in the main Devizes to Westminster race. The Thameside Series is based around Reading, with two races, going from Aldermaston to Reading and Reading to Marlow respectively. The Waterside Series is a series of four races based around Newbury, Berkshire, of lengths 14 miles, 17.5 miles, 23 miles and 34 miles - it is often competed as a series on its own.

See also

Canals of the United Kingdom
History of the British canal system
Thameside Series
Waterside Series

References

External links
Devizes to Westminster Canoe Race Website
Marsport Canoes - Official advice line and helpdesk for the race
Photo feature from 2007 Devizes to Westminster Canoe Race by a professional photographer
To Westminster! - results and stats for the 2009 race 
The Paddler's Perspective - 3rd party website

Canoeing and kayaking competitions in the United Kingdom
Kennet and Avon Canal
Devizes
Canoe marathon